When the 1990s began, Billboard magazine published two rock charts, Album Rock Tracks and Modern Rock Tracks, and the two formats played a decidedly different set of artists with a few exceptions. Crossover between the two began to increase, however, with the rise and emergence of alternative rock such as grunge and a heavier sound that appealed to both genres. Mainstays on the Album Rock chart, such as Def Leppard, Tom Petty and the Heartbreakers, and Van Halen were being mixed in with alternative bands such as Pearl Jam, Red Hot Chili Peppers, and Stone Temple Pilots, to name a few, by the middle part of the decade. The progressive rock of Rush's "Show Don't Tell", the final song to top the chart in the 1980s, had evolved into the post-grunge sound of Creed's "Higher" by the end of the 1990s. Despite the evolution, Van Halen still managed to top the chart more than any other artist during the 1990s with eight number-one songs.

The 1990s brought a new methodology of measuring airplay on the Billboard charts, and its impact was shown in the Album Rock Tracks chart. Songs stayed on the chart for a long time and fewer songs made it on the chart. Ten songs had runs at number one of ten weeks or longer during the 1990s with the longest coming from "Touch, Peel and Stand" by Days of the New at 16 weeks. ("Higher" by Creed spent 17 weeks at the top of the chart but its last couple of weeks ran into the year 2000).

By 1996, rock radio stations had become more song driven rather than album driven. In response, Billboard changed the name of its Album Rock Tracks chart to Mainstream Rock Tracks in April of that year.

Number ones of the 1990s

 – Number-one song of the year

Notes

References

Mainstream 1990s
United States Mainstream Rock